Terminal 2 of Jiangbei Airport, previously known simply as Jiangbei Airport, is an interchange station of Line 3 (straddle beam monorail) and Line 10 (heavy rail subway) of Chongqing Rail Transit in Yubei District of Chongqing Municipality, China. The station opened in 2011 with Line 3 and was expanded in 2017 with Line 10, alongside changing to its current name to differentiate itself from the station at Terminal 3A of the airport.

It serves the airport terminals in which the station's name derived from (Terminals 2A & 2B of Chongqing Jiangbei International Airport) and its surrounding area, including Terminal 1 before its temporary closure since 2017.

Station Structure

Line 3

There are 2 side platforms for Line 3 trains. Only 1 platform is in use as the station is the terminal station for North-bound trains. These trains switch beam (monorail tracks) from right to left before entering the station and stopping at the platform for South-bound trains, where they would terminate. Trains then let south-bound passengers board and would head for that direction (towards Yudong).

Line 10
An island platform is used for Line 10 trains travelling in both directions.

Exits
There are a total of 8 entrances/exits for the station.

Surroundings
Chongqing Jiangbei International Airport
Terminal 3 of Jiangbei Airport station (a Line 10 Station)

See also
Chongqing Jiangbei International Airport
Chongqing Rail Transit (CRT)
Line 3 (CRT)
Line 10 (CRT)

References

Yubei District
Railway stations in Chongqing
Railway stations in China opened in 2011
Airport railway stations in China
Chongqing Rail Transit stations